Saichiro Misumi ( 16 June 1916 –  23 February 2018) was a Japanese indologist, former executive director and the incumbent advisor of the Japan-India Association. He is a World War II veteran, a former Indian National Army officer and an associate of Subhash Chandra Bose, renowned Indian nationalist. Narendra Modi, the Indian Prime Minister, visited him on 2 September 2014 during the former's official visit to Japan and the meeting was widely covered in Indian media. The Ministry of External Affairs, India have drawn up a project to record Misumi's life and times by way of a documentary film, for which they have invited expression of interest. He was honoured by the Government of India in 2015 with the Padma Bhushan, the third highest Indian civilian award for his contributions towards promoting India-Japan relations.

See also

 Subash Chandra Bose
 Indian National Army
 India Japan relations
 Japan-India Association

References

External links
 

Recipients of the Padma Bhushan in other fields
1916 births
2018 deaths
Japanese people of World War II
Japanese people by war
Japanese indologists
Japanese centenarians
Men centenarians